Eskimo Snow is the third studio album by American band Why?. It was released by Anticon on September 22, 2009.

Production
The album was recorded in February 2007. When asked to compare it to his previous albums, Yoni Wolf said: "This record, Eskimo Snow, is really the least hip-hop out of anything I've ever been involved with. I mean, they feel like song-songs with-- I don't want to say a typical verse-chorus structure, but they're song-songs."

Critical reception
At Metacritic, which assigns a weighted average score out of 100 to reviews from mainstream critics, Eskimo Snow received an average score of 76% based on 17 reviews, indicating "generally favorable reviews".

Marisa Brown of AllMusic gave the album 3.5 stars out of 5, calling it "a dynamic, nearly poppy record that finds lead singer Yoni Wolf slightly less verbose and esoteric than in the past." She added, "Eskimo Snow is a success, a resilient album that combines melody, abstract references, and intelligent introspection in equal parts into something that grows more and more compelling the more times it's heard." Josiah Hughes of Exclaim! said, "Eskimo Snow sees Why? losing some of their previous intensity for quieter, albeit deeply layered, pop structures."

Track listing

Personnel
Credits adapted from the album's liner notes.

 Yoni Wolf – music
 Josiah Wolf – music
 Doug McDiarmid – music
 Andrew Broder – music
 Mark Erickson – music
 Jeremy Ylvisaker – additional contributions
 Andrew McDiarmid – additional contributions
 Mark Nevers – additional contributions, mixing
 Eli Crews – mixing
 Mike Wells – mastering
 Ms. Indigo Sweats – artwork
 Phoebe Streblow – photography
 Sam Flax Keener – layout

Charts

References

External links
 

2009 albums
Why? (American band) albums
Anticon albums